Johnny Powers may refer to:

Johnny Powers (musician) (1938–2023), American rockabilly musician
Johnny Powers (wrestler) (1943–2022), Canadian professional wrestler

See also 
Jack Power (disambiguation)
John Power (disambiguation)
John Powers (disambiguation)
Jack Powers (1827–1860), Irish-American gambler and gang leader
Jon Powers (born 1978), American political activist